Tronc is a United States newspaper publisher.

Tronc may also refer to:
Tronc (gratuity), an arrangement for the pooling and distribution to employees of tips, gratuities and/or service charges in the hotel and catering trade

People
André Tronc (b. 1929), French curler
Shane Tronc (b. 1982), Australian rugby league footballer
Scott Tronc (b. 1965), Australian rugby league footballer
Yves Tronc (b. 1960), French sport shooter